Roman Longchamps de Bérier (1883–1941) was a Polish lawyer and university professor, one of the most notable specialists in civil law of his generation and the last rector of the Jan Kazimierz University of Lwów. He was murdered in what became known as the Massacre of Lwów professors.

Biography
Roman Longchamps de Bérier was born in 1883 in Lwów (now Lviv), then a city in Austro-Hungarian Galicia, to a notable family of distant French extraction who left France in the 17th century. The family name gave its moniker to one of the suburbs of the city, "Lonszanówka" (modern Lonsanivka). After finishing his studies at Lemberg university he became a specialist in civil law. In 1918 he served as a volunteer during the Battle of Lwów (1918) and the ensuing Polish-Ukrainian War.

In 1920 he became a professor at the Faculty of Law of the renamed Jan Kazimierz University of Lwów. Two years later he was appointed member of the Commission of Codification of the Republic of Poland, where he took part in preparation of Polish civil law. In 1931 he became a member of the Polish Academy of Skills and in 1936 he was appointed member of the Competention Tribunal, one of the bodies central to solving conflicts between the legislative, executive and judicial branches of government.

After the outbreak of the Polish Defensive War of 1939 he was one of the co-founders of the "Civilian Committee of the Defence of Lwów" that organized the defensive measures for the city during the siege of that city. After the city surrendered to the Soviets and was annexed by the USSR he was relieved of his office, but remained one of the professors of the University. After the outbreak of the Russo-German War on 4 July 1941 he was arrested by the Nazis and murdered in what became known as the massacre of Lwów professors. Among the victims were also three of his sons: Bronisław (b. 1916), Zygmunt (b. 1918) and Kazimierz (b. 1923).

External links
 Adam Redzik, Wydział Prawa Uniwersytetu Lwowskiego w latach 1939-1945
 Archiwum prof. Romana Longchamps de Bérier przekazane w darze dla KUL (Kurier Galicyjski nr 23–24 (243–244) 18 grudnia 2015 – 14 stycznia 2016

1883 births
1941 deaths
Deaths by firearm in Poland
Lawyers from Lviv
University of Lviv rectors
Polish civilians killed in World War II
Polish people of French descent
Members of the Lwów Scientific Society
Commanders of the Order of Polonia Restituta
Victims of the Massacre of Lwów professors
Polish people executed by Nazi Germany
Executed Polish people
20th-century Polish lawyers